Donovan Livingston Blake (born 4 December 1961 in Jamaica) is a Jamaican-born American cricketer. Blake first represented the United States in the 2001 ICC Trophy and he went on to represent the States in a first-class game in the 2004 ICC Intercontinental Cup and then in their second ever One Day International, when they lost to Australia at the Rose Bowl, Southampton, England in 2004. This was his only ODI he played for United States he scored 0 runs and bowled one over conceding 7 runs and no wicket.

External links

1961 births
Living people
American cricketers
United States One Day International cricketers
Jamaican emigrants to the United States
American people of Jamaican descent